Eubranchus rubeolus is a species of minute sea slug, an aeolid nudibranch, a marine gastropod mollusc in the family Eubranchidae. This species occurs in southeastern Australia and South Island, New Zealand.

Distribution
This species was described from Point Lonsdale, Port Phillip Heads, Victoria, Australia. The species has been reported from New Zealand but there are considerable differences between the specimens.

References

Eubranchidae
Gastropods of New Zealand
Gastropods described in 1964